Gratia Alta Countryman (pronounced gray-sha) (November 26, 1866 – July 26, 1953) was a nationally-known librarian who led the Minneapolis Public Library from 1904 to 1936. She was the daughter of immigrant farmers Alta and Levi Countryman. She pioneered many ways to make the library more accessible and user-friendly to all of the city's residents, regardless of age or economic position. Countryman was called the "first lady of Minneapolis" and the "Jane Addams of the libraries".

Professional life 
Countryman graduated from the University of Minnesota with a Bachelor of Science degree in 1889 and started work at the Minneapolis Public Library under James Kendall Hosmer. She was the nation's first female head librarian at the Minneapolis Public Library from 1904 to 1936. When she accepted this job she knew that she would be making one third less than her predecessor, $2000.00 per year.

Due to her philosophy of outreach, collections and reading rooms were established in Minneapolis fire halls, factories, hospitals, and an open-air reading area in Gateway Park. Countryman was a capable leader who, over her 32 years as head librarian, helped increase the library’s scope and reach exponentially. She oversaw the building of 12 branches and a mobile library truck, she and her staff added over 500,000 volumes to the already substantial catalog, the programs she developed encouraged children to read, adolescents and young adults to continue their education, and helped adults find and hold jobs during times of war, recession and depression.

She was very active in the Minnesota Library Association and served as MLA president in 1904 and 1905. She established The Minnesota Library Commission and remained recording secretary of that group until 1918. From 1912 to 1914, Countryman organized and was president of the Foreign Policy Association Women's International League for Peace and Freedom. She also served on the National Liberty and War Service Committee and the Woman's Warfare League.

In 1931, she was awarded the Civic Service Honor Medal by the Inter-Racial Service Council of Minneapolis for Outstanding Civic Service for work with immigrants. In 1932, she was awarded an honorary MA degree from the University of Minnesota for Distinguished Public Service; this was "only the fourth honorary degree conferred by the university and the first received by a woman."

In 1934, Countryman served as president of the American Library Association. She was forced into retirement at age 70 in 1936.

Personal life 
Countryman never married but lived with her longtime partner, Marie Todd, for thirty eight years. In May 1917, they took in a homeless boy named Wellington Wilson, and Countryman later was awarded guardianship of him. Wellington Wilson later changed his name to Wellington Countryman. He eventually married and had a daughter whom he named Alta Countryman after his adoptive mother. The Countrymans lived in Chicago, Illinois, and Wellington died in 1997.

Gratia Countryman's eulogy summed up her life perfectly, "In her youth a library was a sacred precinct for guarding the treasures of thought, to be entered only by the scholar and the student... Her crusading zeal carried the book to every part of her city and county, to the little child, the factory worker, the farmer, the businessman, the hospital patient, the blind and the old."

References

Further reading
 Countryman, Gratia.  Library Work as a Profession. (Published by Woman's Occupational Bureau 1930)
 Countryman, Gratia; Shaw, Robert Macgregor; Shaw, Virginia Buffington. "Gratia Countryman's letters to the family twenty three letters written by Gratia Countryman describing a European Bicycle trip in the summer of 1896"
 Countryman, Gratia. Culture and Reform: The Women and the Work of the Women's Club of Minnesota 1907–1914
 Countryman, Gratia. The Privilege for Which We Struggled; Leaders of the Woman's Suffrage Movement in Minnesota
 Countryman, Gratia. Traveling Libraries and a First Step in Developing Libraries, (Boston 1905)
 Countryman, Gratia. Vocations Open to College Women, (The University of Minnesota 1913)
 Kendall, James Hosmer;  Countryman, Gratia. '"Our Frontispiece" Bulletin of Bibliography. 13. 1929. (Worldcat OCLC 27)
 Roberts, Kate, Minnesota 150: The People and the Places that Shape Our State (2007)
 Pejsa, Jane. Gratia Countryman: Her life, her loves, and her library. (Nodin Press, 1995) 
 Peterson, Penny A. Gratia Countryman, more than an ordinary woman. (Minneapolis, Minnesota: Hess, Roise and Co. 2006)

Archives
 	Gratia A. Countryman and family papers . Minnesota Historical Society, 1861-1953. 6 boxes.
 Countryman, Gratia Alta, faculty and alumni papers. University of Minnesota Archives, 1889, 1923, 1951. 1 box.

External links
 Gratia Alta Countryman Digital Collection Hennepin County Library.
 Interview with Jane Pejsa, author of Gratia Countryman: Her Life, Her Loves, Her Library, interviewed by Margot Siegel, NORTHERN LIGHTS Minnesota Author Interview TV Series #328 (1995)

 

1866 births
1953 deaths
American librarians
American women librarians
Minneapolis Public Library
People from Hastings, Minnesota
People from Minneapolis
Presidents of the American Library Association
University of Minnesota alumni
Women's International League for Peace and Freedom people
LGBT people from Minnesota